Faust is the name of the show produced by the East West Theatre Company and directed by Haris Pasovic. The action is set in the foreseeable future and the script is based on texts by Emil Cioran, Bertrand Russell, Christopher Marlowe, Bill Joy, Werener Heisenberg and Haris Pasovic.

An international cast of actors and musicians have participated in the production which synthesizes drama, contemporary dance, acrobatics and music. Themes of the show include intelligence, politics and greed for knowledge, power and money. East West Theatre Company's Faust poses some of the fundamental questions about intellectual capacities, human measure and ethics.

The plot includes faustian bargain and the democratisation of evil Robots, who in this production, are more conscious than humans. Dr. Faust, the character who agrees to give his soul to the devil in exchange for superhuman powers while he is alive, creates bio-robots which develop the ability to decide for themselves and procreate. The robots, who resemble Ridley Scott's humanoid clones from his classic film "Blade Runner", show more emotion than Faust and abandon him altogether.

References

Theatre in Bosnia and Herzegovina
Culture in Sarajevo